The Fraser Valley Rugby Union (FVRU) is the administrative body for rugby union in the Fraser Valley of British Columbia. The FVRU currently consists of 10 rugby clubs.

The Fraser Valley senior men's representative team was known as the Venom.

List of Clubs in FVRU
 Abbotsford RFC  
 Chilliwack Crusaders RFC  
 Chuckanut Bay Geoducks RFC 
 Kamloops Raiders RFC  
 Kelowna Crows RFC  
 Langley RFC  
 Richmond RFC
 Ridge Meadow Bruins RFC 
 Surrey Beavers Athletic Association
 United Rugby Club

See also
Rugby Canada
Rugby Canada Super League
British Columbia Rugby Union

External links
 BCRU Home Page
 FVRU Homepage

Rugby union governing bodies in Canada
Rugby union in British Columbia